Chester Hazen (January 31, 1824April 24, 1900) was an American farmer, Republican politician, and Wisconsin pioneer.  He was the 29th mayor of Ripon, Wisconsin, and served one term in the Wisconsin State Assembly, representing Fond du Lac County.  He established the first cheese factory in Wisconsin.

Biography

Born in Denmark, New York, Hazen moved to Wisconsin Territory in 1844. He eventually settled on a farm in Ladoga, Wisconsin, where he started the first cheese factory in Wisconsin. Hazen also helped found the Fond du Lac Dairyman Association and the Wisconsin Dairyman Association. Hazen served in the Wisconsin State Assembly from 1885 to 1886. In 1895, he moved to Ripon, Wisconsin, where he served as mayor. He died in Ripon.

References

1824 births
1900 deaths
People from Lewis County, New York
People from Fond du Lac County, Wisconsin
Businesspeople from Wisconsin
Republican Party members of the Wisconsin State Assembly
Mayors of places in Wisconsin
People from Ripon, Wisconsin
19th-century American politicians
19th-century American businesspeople